Freakdog is a 2008 British horror film directed by Paddy Breathnach, that originally went under the title Red Mist.

Plot
The film follows seven medical students who, while out partying one night, spike the drink of an unknowing and loner hospital janitor Kenneth, nicknamed "Freakdog". However, he has epilepsy and goes into a seizure before falling and hitting his head. His injury, combined with the alcohol and the drugs that he has ingested, causes him to fall into a deep coma. The students, not wanting to be involved or risk their futures for their crime, abandon his body on a road in front of the hospital and drive off as fast as they can, hoping someone will come across his body and help him. When they learn about his condition becoming fatal, one of the students (Arielle Kebbel) attempts to revive him using an experimental drug. The result has horrible and unintended consequences, leading to Freakdog having out of body experiences that allow him to possess the students who poisoned him and abandoned him. He exacts vengeance by possessing their bodies and through them, framing them for murdering each other while they desperately search for a way to stop him.

Cast
 Arielle Kebbel as Katherine
 Sarah Carter as Kim
 Andrew Lee Potts as Kenneth, the janitor, cruelly nicknamed "Freakdog"
 Art Parkinson as Young Kenneth
 Stephen Dillane as Doctor Harris
 Alex Wyndham as Jake
 Katie McGrath as Harriet
 Christina Chong as Yoshimi
 Martin Compston as Sean
 Michael Jibson as Steve
 MyAnna Buring as Shelby
 Colin Stinton as Detective Cartert
 Nick Hardin as Walt
 Michael J. Reynolds as Dr Stegman
 Sarah Boyd Wilson as Vanessa
 Emmett J. Scanlan as Stranger
 Nathan S. Stewart as Handsome bar patron

Production
Although set in the United States, the film was shot on location in Belfast, Northern Ireland.

Reception
The film received a limited cinema release and reviews of the film were generally poor. Rotten Tomatoes gave it only 8% based on 13 reviews.

Release
The film premiered on 22 August 2008 as part of the UK Fright Fest.

Home media 
The DVD and Blu-ray was released on 10 February 2009 in the United States. In the UK and Ireland, the film was released on 3 July 2009 as Red Mist.

References

External links
 
 
 

2008 films
Films shot in Northern Ireland
British horror films
British slasher films
English-language Irish films
2008 horror films
Irish horror films
Irish slasher films
Films directed by Paddy Breathnach
2000s English-language films
2000s British films